Ray Guns Are Not Just the Future is the second studio album by American indie pop duo The Bird and the Bee, released on January 27, 2009, by Blue Note Records. The album contains the two lead-off tracks from the duo's last two studio EPs: "Polite Dance Song" from Please Clap Your Hands and "Birthday" from One Too Many Hearts.

Track listing

Personnel
Credits for Ray Guns Are Not Just the Future adapted from liner notes.

The Bird and the Bee
 Greg Kurstin – bass, engineer, guitar, keyboards, mixing, percussion, producer, programming (all tracks); backing vocals (3, 4, 5)
 Inara George – vocals

Additional personnel
 Mike Andrews – guitar (4)
 Autumn de Wilde – photography
 Megan Geer-Alsop – backing vocals (10)
 Willow Geer-Alsop – backing vocals (4, 6, 10, 14)
 Perry Greenfield – artist development management
 Gordon H. Jee – creative director
 Keith Karwelies – A&R administration
 Carla Leighton – art direction, design
 Alex Lilly – backing vocals (4, 6, 10, 14)
 Gavin Lurssen – mastering
 Gus Seyffert – guitar (10)
 Kazumi Someya – translation (6)
 Joey Waronker – drums (1, 9, 10)
 Eli Wolf – A&R

Charts

References

2009 albums
Albums produced by Greg Kurstin
The Bird and the Bee albums
Blue Note Records albums